The Top of His Head is a 1989 Canadian comedy-drama film written and directed by Peter Mettler. The film stars starring Stephen Ouimette as Gus, a satellite dish salesman whose life is turned upside down when he meets Lucy (Christie MacFadyen), a politically radical performance artist who is on the run from mysterious people pursuing her.

The film premiered in the Perspective Canada program at the 1989 Festival of Festivals.

Cast
  Christie MacFadyen as Lucy Ripley
  Stephen Ouimette as Gus Victor
  David Fox as Uncle Hugo
  Gary Reineke as Berge (pursuer)
  Julian Richings as Robert (henchman)
  Joey Hardin as Joey (henchman)
  Cherie Camp as Telephone Operator
  Nora Currie as Telephone Operator

Production
The film was shot in Toronto, Ontario, in the fall of 1987.

The film's soundtrack, The Top of His Head was written and composed by Fred Frith. Jane Siberry also contributed a song, "This Old Earth", which received a Genie Award nomination for Best Original Song at the 1990 Genie Awards. The song also appeared on her 1989 album Bound by the Beauty, under the alternate title "Something About Trains".

Awards
In addition to Siberry's Best Original Song nod, the film also received Genie nominations for Best Actor (Ouimette) and Best Original Screenplay (Mettler).

References

External links
 

1989 films
English-language Canadian films
Canadian comedy-drama films
1989 comedy-drama films
Films directed by Peter Mettler
Films shot in Toronto
1980s English-language films
1980s Canadian films